The O.E. Meinzer Award is the annual award of the Hydrogeology Division of the Geological Society of America. Established in 1965, it is named after Oscar Edward Meinzer who has been called the "father of modern groundwater hydrology". The Meinzer award recognizes the author or authors of a publication or body of publications that have significantly advanced the science of hydrogeology or a closely related field.

List of Recipients
Starting in 1973, the list of recipients is available from the National Ground Water Association website.

1965	Tóth, József
1966	McGuinness, C. L.
1967	Stallman, Robert W.
1968	Hantush, Mahdi S.
1969	Cooper, Hilton H., Jr.
1970	Stringfield, Victor T.
1971	Maxey, George B.
1972	Poland, Joseph F. and Davis, George H.
1973	Back, William and Hanshaw, Bruce B.
1974	Freeze, R. Allan
1975	Bredehoeft, John D. and Pinder, George F.
1976	Neuman, Shlomo P. and Witherspoon, Paul A.
1977	Rubin, Jacob and James, Ronald V.
1978	Nelson, William R.
1979	Sharp, John. M., Jr., and Domenico, P. A.
1980	Cooley, Richard. L.
1981	Bennett, Gordon D.
1983	Weeks, Edwin P.
1984	Schwartz, Franklin W. and Smith, Leslie. J.
1985	Cherry, John A.
1986	Narasimhan, T. N.
1987	Gelhar, Lynn W.
1988	Winograd, Isaac J.
1989	Davis, Stanley N.
1990	Hem, John D.
1991	Neuzil, Christopher E.
1992	Bethke, Craig M.
1993	Plummer, L. Niel
1994	Gorelick, Steven M.
1995	Garven, Grant
1996	Wilson, John L.
1997	Konikow, Leonard F.
1998	Mary P. Anderson
1999	Sudicky, Edward A.
2000	Chapelle, Francis H.
2001	Philips, Fred M.
2002	Winter, Thomas C.
2003	Ingebritsen, Steven E.
2004	de Marsily, Ghislain
2005	Siegel, Donald I.
2006	Pruess, Karsten
2007	Frape, Shaun
2008	Thorstenson, Donald C.
2009   Edmunds, W. Mike
2010   Baedecker, Mary Jo
2011   Fogg, Graham E.
2012   Parkhurst, David L.
2013   Zheng, Chunmiao
2014   Harvey, Charles F.
2015   Berkowitz, Brian
2016   Andrew T. Fisher
2017   Donald O. Rosenberry
2018   Shemin Ge
2019   Bridget R. Scanlon
2020   William W. Woessner
2021   Mark Person

See also

 List of geology awards
 List of earth sciences awards
 Prizes named after people

References

Geological Society of America
Hydrology
Science and technology awards
Earth sciences awards